HIP 41378 f (also known as EPIC 211311380 f)  is an exoplanet orbiting around the F-type star HIP 41378. It has an anomalously large radius (9.2 ) for a planet of its size and temperature, therefore the radius may actually be that of an optically thick ring system. It is located within the optimistic habitable zone of its parent star. No atmospheric signatures were found as in 2022, further reinforcing the hypothesis of opaque circumplanetary rings.

See also
 Lists of exoplanets
 Gliese 1132 b, rocky exoplanet with a confirmed atmosphere.
 Mu Arae c, in the constellation Ara
 Planetary system

References

Exoplanets discovered in 2016
Transiting exoplanets
HIP 41378
Cancer (constellation)